Erland Johansson (born 29 August 1960) is a Swedish sports shooter. He competed in the men's 50 metre running target event at the 1984 Summer Olympics.

References

External links
 

1960 births
Living people
Swedish male sport shooters
Olympic shooters of Sweden
Shooters at the 1984 Summer Olympics
People from Ängelholm Municipality
Sportspeople from Skåne County